Gold Dust is a novel by the international novelist Ibrahim Al-Koni, is the only Arab novel in which a foreign animal, the "blessed dowry", is a main hero whose influence on the course of events is no less than that of the other characters in the novel.

The novel won the Japanese Committee for Translation Award in 1997.

Actions 
The novel focuses on two themes that are dear to Ibrahim al-Koni: sin and freedom, although they do not cover it. The sin here goes beyond the direct sexual meaning of the male-female relationship. It is closer to the mystical meaning, where sin is the dependence of the human heart on all worldly relationships: father, wife, boy, friend, leadership and money...etc.

And if the “blessed dowry” had fallen ill, and lost his splendor as a result of intercourse, and it was necessary to heal him, and restore his splendor and purity from penance for sin by castrating him, then “Okhid” cursed by his father and expelled from the tribe because of his attraction to the woman, who broke his promise for her, The one who surrendered to the temptation of Gold Dust (the major polytheism, the root of evil, and the cause of conflict between human beings) at the hands of his opponent and lover of his wife “Dodo” the owner of the gold dust, had to be purified, possess his freedom, and set him free from slavery, not only his retirement from people, divorce of his wife, the killing of her lover “Dodo” and the abandonment of the child, the righteousness and the tribe. Rather, it is also the sacrifice of himself and his acceptance of his surrender to the dismemberment of his body by his enemies, thus fulfilling the commandment of “Sheikh Musa”: ((Do not leave your heart in a place other than heaven)).

Finally, Gold Dust is perhaps the only Arab novel in which a foreign animal enjoys the "blank pony" as a main hero whose influence on the course of events is no less than that of the other characters in the novel.

Analysis 
The following is a detailed analysis:

 The semiotic analysis of Al-Tabar's novel

Ibrahim Al-Koni's novel is based on the symbol that presents a mystical narrative that differs from the apparent novel. And under these two symbols falls a series of other symbols. Everything inside the novel is a symbol, or rather a sign, according to Ibrahim's Cosmic Linguistic Dictionary. The dream is a sign, the secret is a sign, the cave drawings are a sign, the desert animals are a sign, and others.[1] A sign that the latter did not succeed in reading it, but he kept holding on to the ablaq until the vow was overturned and Okhid became the sacrifice offered to the divine Tanit. Exile is freedom, in which a person is emancipated from the captivity of ownership and is liberated, except that Ukhaid and because he is a blind slave, that is, he is a slave who does not realize that he is a slave, so he could not be freed while he was alive, and perhaps he was liberated when he died, that is, when he was able at the moment of his death to understand the meaning of the sign.

 The stylistic analysis of Al-Tabar's novel, and this analysis became clear through the following:

 The linguistic formation, where the author chose suspense as a stylistic feature that forms the bridge between the narrator and the reader, and for this function he used vocabulary from the desert linguistic lexicon, and the technique of description, repetition, presentation and delay was used. In addition to the use of multiple narrative techniques, the most important of which are interrogative, forbidding, and others. 
 The graphic composition appears clearly through the use of metaphor and poetics in the structures and allegorical formation in terms of description and depiction, as well as the use of graphic images, allegory, metaphor, metonymy, renewal, personification, and simile, all with the aim of transporting the reader to the miraculous world of the novel and integrating it with it.

 The semiological analysis of Al-Tebr's novel:

Semiology was clearly present throughout the novel, and this was evident through the following:[2] The duality of survival and annihilation dominates the desert space. The text is based on mythology where al-Koni employed symbols, allusions, and myths. The legend appears within the text alive and interactive, shaping the course of events and affecting the development of the characters. The animal occupies a great place in Al-Koni, and has a major role in the novel. Al-Koni relied on intertextuality at the beginning of some chapters of the novel to play a preparatory and indicative role that indirectly indicates what will happen in the events, as well as on the mystical feature in the narration of the novel.

English translation 
The novel was translated into English by the American translator and academic Elliott Colla.

References 

Arabic-language novels
1992 novels